Jerónimo Saavedra Acevedo (born 3 July 1936 in Las Palmas de Gran Canaria) is a Spanish politician. He served as President of the Canary Islands twice from 1982 to 1987, and again from 1991 to 1993.

Biography

In 1972 he joined the Spanish Socialist Workers' Party (PSOE), as well as the Unión General de Trabajadores (UGT). Being the General secretary of the Canarian Federation of PSOE from 1976 to 1983. Saavedra was elected deputy for the Constituent Cortes in 1977 and re-elected deputy in 1979, 1982 and 1989, representing Las Palmas. During the last Government of Felipe González (5th legislature) Saavedra held the positions of Minister of Public Administrations between 1993 and 1995 and Minister of Education and Science between 1995 and 1996.

In 1996 and from 1999 to 2003 he was elected senator.

In 2007 was elected mayor of Las Palmas de Gran Canaria in a landslide victory, bringing the twelve-year rule of his conservative People's Party predecessors to an end. An office he held until his defeat in his reelection attempt in 2011. He was designated as Ombudsman (Diputado del Común) in the Canary Islands, between 2011 and 2018 which made him leave the Spanish Socialist Workers' Party (PSOE).

Saavedra used to teach at Spanish universities—mainly Universidad de Las Palmas de Gran Canaria (ULPGC)—and holds a Doctor of Law and a diploma in Company Administration.

Personal life
In 2000 during the presentation of a book on outing in Spain he announced publicly that he was gay.

Likewise, this also led him to become the first openly gay politician in the history of Spain to hold various public offices, such as the first homosexual in the Senate of Spain (a position he held until 2004), as well as being the first gay mayor of a Spanish provincial capital (Las Palmas de Gran Canaria), as well the first governmental minister serving as Minister of Public Administrations between 1993–1995 and of Education and Science 1995–1996, as well as the first gay President of an Autonomous Community from 1982 to 1987, and again from 1991 to 1993.

References 

1936 births
Living people
Presidents of the Canary Islands
Mayors of places in the Canary Islands
People from Las Palmas
LGBT mayors of places in Spain
LGBT legislators in Spain
LGBT governors and heads of sub-national entities
Government ministers of Spain
Members of the constituent Congress of Deputies (Spain)
Members of the 1st Congress of Deputies (Spain)
Members of the 2nd Congress of Deputies (Spain)
Members of the 4th Congress of Deputies (Spain)
Members of the Senate of Spain
Spanish Socialist Workers' Party politicians
Gay politicians
Members of the 1st Parliament of the Canary Islands
Members of the 2nd Parliament of the Canary Islands
Members of the 3rd Parliament of the Canary Islands
Members of the 4th Parliament of the Canary Islands
LGBT heads of government